Provinces were abolished in New Zealand and the Central Government took control and education. The Education Act 1877 established twelve regional Education Boards, including this the Wanganui Education Board.

Timeline
1892 - Wanganui Technical School - founded by the Wanganui Education Board
1905 - End of year figures: Schools 85, teaching staff 374, number of pupils 12,983. (Student teacher ratio: 34.7) gross revenue £78,078.
1906 - "The Wanganui Education Board has jurisdiction over a district which comprises the Counties of Wanganui, Waitotara, Hawera, Patea, Waimarino, Rangitikei, Oroua, Kairanga, Kiwitea, Pohangina, and Manawatu". (The Cyclopedia of New Zealand - The Education Board) - The offices of the Wanganui Education Board are in Nixon Street.

Primary schools

Secondary schools

Educational organisations based in New Zealand